Julien Bogaert (18 August 1924 – 3 October 2018) was a Belgian sprint canoeist who competed in the late 1940s. He was eliminated in the heats in the K-1 1000 m event at the 1948 Summer Olympics in London.

References
Julien Bogaert's profile at Sports Reference.com
Julien Bogaert's obituary

1924 births
2018 deaths
Belgian male canoeists
Canoeists at the 1948 Summer Olympics
Olympic canoeists of Belgium
20th-century Belgian people